Transmissions is the debut studio album by American rock band Starset, released on July 8, 2014, through Razor & Tie. Three singles were released in support of the album; "My Demons", "Carnivore", and "Halo", all charting in the top 20 of the US Billboard Mainstream Rock chart.

Background
Transmissions is a concept album. The album was produced by Rob Graves and mixed by Ben Grosse. A deluxe version of the album was released on iTunes on February 12, 2016, featuring four new acoustic recordings of songs "My Demons", "Halo", "Point of No Return", and "Let It Die" along with three previously released remixed tracks. As of November 2016, the album has sold 79,000 copies in the United States, according to Billboard. and a quarter million overall, factoring in album sales, downloads, and streaming.

Track listing

Personnel 
Musicians
 Dustin Bates – vocals, guitars, bass 
 Rob Graves – programming, guitars, strings arrangement
 Alex Niceford – programming
 Chris Flury – programming
 Rob Hawkins – programming
 Josh Baker – programming, guitars
 Joe Rickard – programming, drums
 David Davidson – strings arrangement, violin
 David Angell – violin
 Monisa Angell – viola
 John Catchings – cello
 Miles McPherson – additional drums (9)

Production
 Rob Graves – production, engineering
 Ben Grosse – mixing
 Paul Pavao – mixing
 Maor Appelbaum – mastering
 Ben Schmitt – engineering
 Brian Virtue – drums engineering
 Baheo "Bobby" Shin – strings engineering

Charts

Singles

References 

2014 debut albums
Starset albums
Razor & Tie albums